The 1949 Kent State Golden Flashes football team was an American football team that represented Kent State University in the Ohio Athletic Conference (OAC) during the 1949 college football season. In its fourth season under head coach Trevor J. Rees, Kent State compiled a 5–3 record.

Schedule

References

Kent State
Kent State Golden Flashes football seasons
Kent State Golden Flashes football